Thomas Scott (c. 1828 – 1883) was a Canadian political figure. He represented Grey North in the Legislative Assembly of Ontario as a Conservative member from 1867 to 1875.

He was born in Nottingham, England. He served on the council for Grey County and also as mayor of Owen Sound.

External links 

The Canadian parliamentary companion and annual register, 1874, HJ Morgan

1883 deaths
Progressive Conservative Party of Ontario MPPs
Mayors of Owen Sound
English emigrants to pre-Confederation Ontario
Politicians from Nottingham
Year of birth uncertain
1828 births